This is a list of number-one singles in the Dutch Top 40. The Dutch Top 40 is a chart that ranks the best-performing singles of the Netherlands since 1965. It is published weekly by radio station Radio 538. In this article, an alphabetical list of the number-one singles  in order of performing artist(s) can be found.

External links
All information about the number-one singles can be found on the official site of the Dutch Top 40.

Dutch Top 40